The Legislative Assembly of the State of Rondônia (Portuguese: Assembleia Legislativa do Estado de Rondônia) is the legislative body of the government of state of Rondônia in Brazil.

It is composed of 24 state deputies. It is located in Porto Velho, Rondônia.

External links

Official site

State legislatures of Brazil
Politics of Rondônia
Rondônia
Unicameral legislatures